Trigena crassa is a moth in the family Cossidae. It was described by Schaus in 1911. It is found in Costa Rica.

References

Natural History Museum Lepidoptera generic names catalog

Cossinae
Moths described in 1911